High Speed or high-speed may refer to:

Films
 High Speed (1917 film), starring Jack Mulhall and Fritzi Ridgeway
 High Speed (1920 film), an American drama directed by Charles Miller
 High Speed (1924 film), featuring Herbert Rawlinson and Carmelita Geraghty
 High Speed (1932 film), an American film starring Buck Jones
 High Speed (1986 film), a French film directed by Monique Dartonne and Michel Kaptur
 High Speed, a 2002 British-Italian film starring Paul Nicholls

Games
 High Speed (pinball), a 1986 pinball game
 The Getaway: High Speed II, a 1992 pinball game
 High Speed (video game), a pinball video game based on Steve Ritchie's 1986 pinball machine

Music
 High Speed E.P., a 1997 release by PAX, a side project of the German band X Marks the Pedwalk
 "High Speed", a song by 2Pac and Outlawz from their 1999 album Still I Rise
 "High Speed", a song by Coldplay from their 2000 album Parachutes

Other uses
 High Speed!, a light novel by Kōji Ōji that is the predecessor to the anime series Free!
 High Speed Championship
 High-speed photography
 High Speed Photometer
 High-speed rail
 High Speed 1, a high-speed railway between London and the Channel Tunnel
 High Speed 2, a planned high-speed railway between London and various other cities
 High-speed steel
 Monteverdi High Speed